Wonderboom Airport  is located in  Pretoria North, South Africa.

History

The airport was opened in 1937, being built on the farm Wonderboom approximately 15 km north of Pretoria. Originally a civilian airstrip for light aircraft, it was used for military training purposes during the Second World War before returning to civilian control in 1945. The airport remains a light aircraft facility to this day.

In 1965, the airport was extensively extended, with a new terminal building and hangars being constructed as well as the runways being extended. This led to Wonderboom Airport being able to receive its first Boeing 737 in 1982. In 1993, runway 11/29 was again upgraded to its present length of 1,828 m.

Airport management passed to the Greater Pretoria Metropolitan Council in December 1994. Towards the end of 2000, ownership passed to Pretoria.

Scheduled service plans
In 2007, plans were mooted by the city of Pretoria for scheduled passenger service from Wonderboom Airport. The municipality spent R165.5 million in order to upgrade the airport in anticipation of passenger flights. In July 2009, it was announced that scheduled passenger service to Cape Town and Durban was due to commence in October 2009.

The airport would initially be able to cope with 450 departing and 400 incoming passengers per hour. It is believed that there is a market for passenger service, mainly Pretoria residents that do not wish to commute to OR Tambo International Airport in Johannesburg; an estimated 25%-30% of passengers using O.R. Tambo are Pretoria residents.

Accidents and incidents
On 24 August 1998, Aero Modifications International DC-3-65TP ZS-NKK of Speed Service Couriers crashed on take-off. The aircraft had been in maintenance. Witnesses on duty in the control tower as well as a passing motorist reported seeing a long flame squirting out of the left engine on takeoff. The result was an engine engulfed in fire on impact. During the emergency the aircraft APR (Automatic Power Reserve) on the right engine kicked in to compensate for the loss of power on the left engine, boosting it with over 100 hp more and thus causing the aircraft to violently roll over almost onto its roof. The pilots reacted by closing the throttles to try and stop the roll but were too low and the wing tip struck the ground, pulling the aircraft's nose into the ground. One of the two crew was killed. The aircraft was on a mail flight to Durban International Airport.
The 2018 Pretoria Convair 340 crash on 10 July, took place near Wonderboom Airport minutes after taking off from it. Two people, one among 19 occupants in the plane and one on the ground, died during this crash of the Convair which was making a training flight, with plans to be later flown to the Netherlands.

References

External links

 Official website
 Aerial photograph on Google Maps
Wonderboom Airport Interest Group

Buildings and structures in Pretoria
Airports in South Africa
Airfields of the United States Army Air Forces Air Transport Command in Central and South Africa
Transport in Pretoria
World War II airfields in South Africa